The Winter of the Witch is a 2019 historical fantasy novel written by Katherine Arden. It is the third novel in the Winternight trilogy. The Winter of the Witch is set in medieval Russia and incorporates elements of Russian folklore.

References

Fantasy novel series
American fantasy novels
Historical fantasy novels
Young adult fantasy novels
2019 fantasy novels
Slavic mythology in popular culture
Del Rey books